The 1978 Asian Games were held in National Stadium, Bangkok, Thailand from 14 December to 19 December. The event was not sanctioned by the International Amateur Athletics Federation due to the organizers' refusal to invite Israel.

Medalists

Men

Women

Medal table

References
Asian Games Results. GBR Athletics. Retrieved on 2014-10-04.
Women's relay medallists. Incheon2014. Retrieved on 2014-10-04.
Men's relay medallists. Incheon2014. Retrieved on 2014-10-04.

 
1978 Asian Games events
1978
Asian Games
1978 Asian Games